The following highways are numbered 652:

United States